Varvan (also Romanized as Varvān; also known as Barband) is a village in Farmahin Rural District, in the Central District of Farahan County, Markazi Province, Iran. At the 2006 census, its population was 121, in 34 families.

References 

Populated places in Farahan County